George William Nevin  (16 December 1907 - January 1973) was an English footballer. His regular position was at full back. He was born in Lintz, County Durham. He played for Newcastle United, Sheffield Wednesday, Manchester United, Burnley and Lincoln City.

References

External links
MUFCInfo.com profile

1907 births
1973 deaths
English footballers
Newcastle United F.C. players
Sheffield Wednesday F.C. players
Manchester United F.C. players
Burnley F.C. players
Lincoln City F.C. players
Rochdale A.F.C. players
English Football League players
Association football fullbacks
People from Burnopfield
Footballers from County Durham